Reinaldo Varela (born 17 April 1959) is a Brazilian rally raid racer in the car and later Side-by-side categories. He had been a two-time world champion in the T2 class car category and won the Rally dos Sertões in the car category twice. In 2018, he entered the Dakar Rally in the Side by Side category, winning five stages and triumphing in the general classification, being his navigator the Brazilian Gustavo Gugelmin.

Career results

Rally Dakar results

References

Racing drivers from São Paulo
1959 births
Living people
Enduro riders
Brazilian motorcycle racers
Brazilian rally drivers
Dakar Rally motorcyclists
Dakar Rally winning drivers
Off-road motorcycle racers